

Cydia illutana is a small moth of the family Tortricidae. It is found from western and central Europe (Great Britain, the Netherlands, Austria, Germany and France), north to Scandinavia (Denmark, Norway, Sweden and Finland) and east to Russia (Siberia).

The wingspan is 12–14 mm. Adults are on wing in May and June. There is one generation per year.

The caterpillars feed on the scales of conifer cones. Host plants are European silver fir (Abies alba), European larch (Larix decidua), Dahurian larch (L. gmelinii), Siberian larch (L. sibirica), Norway spruce (Picea abies), Siberian spruce (P. (a.) obovata) and common Douglas-fir (Pseudotsuga menziesii). They pupate in peat or rotting wood.

The larval feeding activity disrupt the maturing of the cones and the ejection of the seeds of the host plant.

Synonyms
Junior synonyms of this species are:
 Laspeyresia ibeeliana Karpinski, 1962
 Laspeyresia illutana (Herrich-Schäffer, 1851)
 Lapseyresia illutana dahuricolana Kuznetzov, 1962
 Tortrix (Grapholitha) illutana Herrich-Schäffer, 1851

In addition, the specific name illutana was used in a list of tortrix moths by G.A.W. Herrich-Schäffer in 1847 already. But he did not provide a description then, thus the scientific name was validly established by him only in 1851.

Footnotes

References
  (2009): Online World Catalogue of the Tortricidae – Cydia illutana. Version 1.3.1. Retrieved 2010-APR-19.
  (1942): Eigenartige Geschmacksrichtungen bei Kleinschmetterlingsraupen ["Strange tastes among micromoth caterpillars"]. Zeitschrift des Wiener Entomologen-Vereins 27: 105-109 [in German]. PDF fulltext
  (2005): Markku Savela's Lepidoptera and some other life forms – Cydia illutana. Version of 2005-SEP-13. Retrieved 2010-APR-19.

External links
Eurasian Tortricidae

Grapholitini
Tortricidae of Europe
Moths described in 1851